Mount Lorne is a former electoral district which returned a member (known as an MLA) to the Legislative Assembly of the Yukon Territory in Canada. The riding included the Whitehorse subdivisions of Golden Horn, Wolf Creek, Mary Lake, and Cowley Creek, as well as the Hamlet of Mount Lorne.

In the 2009 electoral redistribution, Mount Lorne was separated, with the Hamlet of Mount Lorne merging with the riding of Southern Lakes to create Mount Lorne-Southern Lakes and the rest of the riding merging with part of the former riding of Copperbelt to former Copperbelt South.

The riding was largely considered a New Democrat stronghold.

MLAs

Electoral results

2006 general election 

|-

| NDP
| Steve Cardiff
| align="right"|361
| align="right"|43.6%
| align="right"| +3.9%

| Liberal
| Colleen Wirth
| align="right"|231
| align="right"|27.9%
| align="right"| -0.2%

|-
! align=left colspan=3|Total
! align=right|828
! align=right|100.0%
! align=right| – 
|}

2002 general election 

|-

| NDP
| Steve Cardiff
| align="right"|334
| align="right"|39.7%
| align="right"| +6.0%

| Liberal
| Cynthia Tucker
| align="right"|236
| align="right"|28.1%
| align="right"| -16.9%

|-
! align=left colspan=3|Total
! align=right|841
! align=right|100.0%
! align=right| – 
|}

2000 general election 

|-

| Liberal
| Cynthia Tucker
| align="right"|563
| align="right"|44.9%
| align="right"| +19.9%

| NDP
| Lois Moorcroft
| align="right"|422
| align="right"|33.7%
| align="right"| -6.8%

|-
! align=left colspan=3|Total
! align=right|1254
! align=right|100.0%
| align="right"| –
|}

1996 general election 

|-

| NDP
| Lois Moorcroft
| align="right"|484
| align="right"|40.5%
| align="right"| +5.7%

| Liberal
| Ken Taylor
| align="right"|299
| align="right"|25.0%
| align="right"| +15.2%

| Independent
| Allen Luheck
| align="right"|166
| align="right"|13.9
| align="right"| -8.3%

|-
! align=left colspan=3|Total
! align=right|1196
! align=right|100.0%
| align="right"| –
|}

1992 general election

|-

| NDP
| Lois Moorcroft
| align="right"|316
| align="right"|34.8%
| align="right"| –

| Independent
| Barb Harris
| align="right"|202
| align="right"|22.2%
| align="right"| –

| Liberal
| Roger Moore
| align="right"|89
| align="right"|9.8%
| align="right"| –
|-
! align=left colspan=3|Total
! align=right|909
! align=right| 100.0%
! align=right| –
|}

References 

Former Yukon territorial electoral districts